WUCF-FM (89.9 MHz) is a listener-supported radio station of the University of Central Florida in Orlando, Florida, United States. The station is one of Central Florida's two NPR member stations, along with WMFE-FM.

WUCF-FM is co-owned and operated by the University of Central Florida.

Programming
The station broadcasts a 24-hour schedule of jazz and blues music along with news programming from broadcast studios on the main campus of UCF. The station is a part of the University of Central Florida College of Arts and Humanities and employs several university students.

In addition to its own line-up of jazz programming blocks, the station airs syndicated jazz music programming from National Public Radio and other distributors including Jazz Inspired, Jazz Profiles, JazzWorks and Jazz Night In America. The station also airs reruns of news programs Metro Center Outlook and Global Perspectives from its sister channel WUCF-TV. Since 2002, WUCF has hosted the syndicated blues rock program Smokestack Lightnin'.

See also
 List of jazz radio stations in the United States

References

External links

University of Central Florida
UCF-FM
Jazz radio stations in the United States
NPR member stations
Radio stations established in 1978
1978 establishments in Florida
UCF-FM